Santa Fe River may refer to a water body in the United States:

 Santa Fe River (Florida)
 Santa Fe River (New Mexico)

See also
Santa Fe (disambiguation)